The 1901 South Australian Football Association season was the 25th season of the top-level Australian rules football competition in South Australia. Minor premier  won its 12th premiership. The season marked the formation and debut of the new Sturt Football Club.

Season 
The season was played under conventions similar to, but was amended from, the previous two seasons and the system used in the VFL in 1898–1900.

In the minor round, all seven clubs played a double round-robin of twelve matches, and in the major round, all seven clubs played a single round-robin of six matches.

If the minor premiers won the major round, then that team would automatically win the major premiership. If they did not, then the major round winner would be required to defeat the minor premiers in two separate challenge finals to claim the premiership, effectively giving the minor premiers a triple chance to win the premiership.

The minor premier was Norwood, which finished two games clear on top of the ladder with a 10–2 record; however, the club's major round performance was mediocre, finishing fourth with a record of 3–3. Conversely, Port Adelaide, who had finished fourth in the minor rounds with a 6–6 record, was the undefeated winner of the major round.

Norwood then defeated Port Adelaide by four points in the first challenge match to win the club's twelfth premiership.

Final competition placings were based on the combined major and minor round results. As such, Sturt – which was second-last in both the major and minor rounds – was finished in last place overall and is recognised as wooden spooner in its inaugural season.

Minor round

Major round

Challenge Final

Notable events 
 South Adelaide did not play its final two major round matches, scheduled for 21 and 28 September against West Adelaide and Sturt. The match against West Adelaide was ruled to have been forfeited by the SAFA after the Jubilee Oval had been double-booked, meaning that West Adelaide arrived at the ground to discover there was a cricket match in progress. The match against Sturt was scratched as the ladder would not be affected; this is historically considered to be an unplayed game, with no competition points awarded to either team.

References 

SAFA
South Australian National Football League seasons